Segovia-Guiomar is a central railway station of Segovia, Spain. Situated at the south of the town in the vicinity of the Hontoria Industrial Park, it has effectively replaced the old Estación de Segovia in the centre of the town, which now only serves as the terminus of the regional Line 53 from Madrid.

As a stop of the AVE high-speed rail line from Madrid Chamartín to Valladolid Campo Grande, it is directly and indirectly connected to numerous destinations in northern and eastern Spain, such as Alicante, San Sebastián, Salamanca, Barcelona and even Dijon in France. For many of these routes, passengers may choose between the slightly faster and more frequently departing AVE trains and the more affordable Alvia and Avant services.

References

External links
 renfe.com
 ferropedia.es/mediawiki/index.php/Estaci%C3%B3n_de_Segovia_Guiomar

Railway stations in Spain opened in 2007
Railway stations in Castile and León
Buildings and structures in Segovia